The Royal Palace of Durrës, sometimes known as the Konak of Durrës, was a royal palace of the Principality of Albania situated in Durrës, Albania. It previously served as the chief official residence of Wilhelm, Prince of Albania, and his wife, Princess Sophie of Schönburg-Waldenburg. It has been used by different Albanian governments for various purposes.

History
This royal residence had been the seat of the Ottoman prefect (mutasarriflik) of Durrës. The three floors of the building with an interior courtyard contained thirty-five rooms. Its facade was ca. 50 metres wide. Prince Wilhelm of Wied arrived in Albania at his capital of Durrës on March 7, 1914, along with the Royal Family. Wilhelm, who reigned as 'Vilhelm, Prince of Albania', moved into the building five months later and used it as his palace for his six month reign, when furnishing and a modest bevy of servants were brought from Germany. The palace was raided after the departure of Prince Wilhelm by Muslim rebels and Haxhi Qamili. 

On October 2, 1918, the palace, along with the entire city of Durrës, was bombarded on the orders Admiral Dominique-Marie Gauchet of the French Navy during the Battle of Durrës. The order was executed by Admiral The Marchese di Revel of the Regia Marina aboard the Dante Alighieri. Admiral Gauchet had followed the instructions of General Louis Franchet d'Espèrey, who was serving the Macedonian front on account of the Allies, and according to whom, the Port of Durres, if not destroyed, would have served the evacuation of the Bulgarian and German armies involved in the First World War.  The earthquake of 1926 further destroyed the palace and, by 1930, there were no longer any remains.

See also 

 Essad Pasha Toptani
 International Gendarmerie

References

External link

Buildings and structures in Durrës
1914 in Albania
Modern history of Albania
Palaces in Albania
Royal residences in Albania